Crestwood School District can refer to:
Crestwood School District (Michigan)
Crestwood School District (Pennsylvania)